Lying in may refer to:

Lying-in, a European term for lengthy bedrest after childbirth
Lying in repose, the process of displaying a deceased person
Lying in state, the process of displaying a coffin